National Conference is one of the three conferences of the CIF Northern Section, a high school athletics governing body part of the California Interscholastic Federation. The conference is divided into four leagues.

Members

Leagues
 Sac River 
 EAL 
 NAL 
 BVL

References

CIF Northern section